The Sokolov Basin or Falkenau Basin (formerly also Falkenau-Elbogen-Karlsbader Becken) is a structural basin and geomorphological mesoregion of the Czech Republic. It is located in the central part of the Karlovy Vary Region. It is named after the town of Sokolov. It is known for its deposits of lignite, which has been extracted here to a greater extent since the second half of 19th century.

Geomorphology
The Sokolov Basin is a mesoregion of the Podkrušnohorská Macroregion within the Bohemian Massif. It runs between two ranges: Ore Mountains in the north and Slavkov Forest in the south. It is no further subdivided into microregions.

Geography
The territory has an elongated shape from southwest to northeast.

The Ohře River flows across the entire territory and drains it. Smaller rivers, such as Svatava, Rolava and Bystřice, flow into it from the mountain ranges along the territory.

Suitable natural conditions contributed to the creation of many settlements in the Sokolov Basin. Most populated cities and towns in the territory are Karlovy Vary, Sokolov, Ostrov, Chodov, and Nová Role.

Economy
The basin is known for lignite mining. It started here on a small scale around 1760 and fully developed after the construction of the railway in 1871. It experienced its peak in the second half of the 20th century, when mining took place mainly underground. Today, mining takes place in a surface mine.

Gallery

References

Landforms of the Czech Republic
Karlovy Vary Region
Coal mining regions in the Czech Republic